Kuo Chun-lin (Japanese romaji:Kaku Shunrin; born 2 February 1992) is a Taiwanese baseball pitcher who is a free agent. He had played for the Saitama Seibu Lions of Nippon Professional Baseball (NPB). He attended the National Taiwan University of Physical Education and Sport.

Career

Saitama Seibu Lions
Kuo signed with the Lions after pitching for the Chinese Taipei national baseball team at the 2014 Asian Games, where he earned a silver medal. In November, Kuo won the final of the inaugural World Baseball Softball Confederation 21U Baseball World Cup by pitching a 9–0 shutout versus Japan. Kuo made his NPB debut against the Orix Buffaloes on March 29, 2015, pitching five innings, giving up three runs and recording the win. He finished the season with a 3–7 record and 5.31 ERA over 21 games, and resigned with the Lions on November 18, 2015 for a one-year contract worth at least ¥30 million. Kuo was named to the Chinese Taipei national baseball team for the 2017 World Baseball Classic. He returned to the Lions in the 2018 season.

On December 2, 2019, Kuo became a free agent.

Fubon Guardians
On September 19, 2020, Kuo signed with the Fubon Guardians of the Chinese Professional Baseball League (CPBL). At the time of his signing, Kuo was still recovering from Tommy John surgery. He made his CPBL debut on November 9, 2021.

References

External links

1992 births
Living people
Asian Games medalists in baseball
Asian Games silver medalists for Chinese Taipei
Baseball players at the 2014 Asian Games
Medalists at the 2014 Asian Games
Nippon Professional Baseball pitchers
People from Hsinchu
Saitama Seibu Lions players
Taiwanese expatriate baseball players in Japan
2015 WBSC Premier12 players
2017 World Baseball Classic players